Margaret Scriven defeated Simonne Mathieu in the final, 6–2, 4–6, 6–4 to win the women's singles tennis title at the 1933 French Championships. It was the last time an unseeded player won the title until Jeļena Ostapenko did so in 2017.

Seeds
The seeded players are listed below. Margaret Scriven is the champion; others show the round in which they were eliminated.

 Lolette Payot (third round)
 Helen Jacobs (semifinals)
 Simonne Mathieu (finalist)
 Hilde Krahwinkel (second round)
 Mary Heeley (quarterfinals)
 Eileen Fearnley Whittingstall (quarterfinals)
 Josane Sigart (second round)
 Ida Adamoff (second round)

Draw

Key
 Q = Qualifier
 WC = Wild card
 LL = Lucky loser
 r = Retired

Finals

Earlier rounds

Section 1

Section 2

Section 3

Section 4

References

External links
 

1933 in women's tennis
1933
1933 in French women's sport
French